Penny Shantz (also known as Penny Ryan and Penny Shantz-Henderson; born May 23, 1960) is a Canadian curler.

She competed at the 1988 Winter Olympics when curling was a demonstration sport. The Canadian women's team won the gold medal, defeating Sweden in the final.

In the 1980s, she was married to famous Canadian curler Pat Ryan, World and Brier champion.

Teams

References

External links
 
 
 Video:  (YouTube-channel "Curl BC") (BC curler Penny Shantz talks about how she got introduced to curling and her experiences competing in the Scotties, the Olympics, and the BC and Canadian Senior Curling Championships)

Living people
1960 births
Curlers from Edmonton
Canadian women curlers
Curlers at the 1988 Winter Olympics
Olympic curlers of Canada
Canada Cup (curling) participants